Code of Canon Law may refer to:

 Corpus Juris Canonici ('Body of Canon Law'), a collection of sources of canon law of the Catholic Church applicable to the Latin Church until 1918
 1917 Code of Canon Law, code of canon law for the Catholic Latin Church from 1918 to 1983
 1983 Code of Canon Law, code of canon law for the Catholic Latin Church from 1983 to today
 Code of Canons of the Eastern Churches, code of canon law for the Catholic Eastern Church from 1991 to today
 The Pedalion, an Eastern Orthodox treatise on canon law by Nicodemus the Hagiorite

See also 
 Canon (canon law)
 Canon law
 Canon law of the Catholic Church
 Eastern Catholic canon law
 Eastern canonical reforms of Pius XII
 Collections of ancient canons
 Canon law of the Eastern Orthodox Church
 Nomocanon
 Kormchaia